As the Spirit Wanes is the second studio album by English post-rock band Codes in the Clouds, released on 18 January 2011 on Erased Tapes Records.

Track listing

Personnel 
 Stephen Peeling - guitar
 Ciaran Morahan - guitar
 Jack Major - drums
 Joe Power - bass
 Pete Lambrou - guitar
 Jerome Alexander - string arrangements (track 3) 
 Robert Raths - producer
 Ryan West - producer, mixing
 Guy Andrews - producer 
 Dan Hopkinson - producer, engineer
 Nils Frahm - mastering
 Joe Pickering - assistant engineer
 Dave Tindale - additional engineer
 Jónas Valt‡sson - artwork

References

2011 albums
Erased Tapes Records albums
Codes in the Clouds albums